Kasinather Saunthararajah   (3 March 1930 – 17 June 2010), known professionally as K. S. Rajah, was a Senior Counsel and Judicial Commissioner of the Supreme Court of Singapore. Born in Penang, he came to Singapore in 1950 and worked as a teacher before embarking on part-time law studies at what was later known as the University of Singapore, graduating in 1963 with a Bachelor of Laws with honours (LL.B. (Hons.)). He then spent the next 22 years with the Singapore Legal Service, eventually heading the civil and criminal divisions of the Attorney-General's Chambers and also serving as Director of the Singapore Legal Aid Bureau and head of the Official Assignee and Public Trustee's Office. In 1985 he retired from the Legal Service and went into private practice, establishing the firm of B. Rao & K. S. Rajah.

In 1991, Rajah was appointed a Judicial Commissioner of the Supreme Court of Singapore. His time on the Bench was marked by a number of significant family law cases, including one in 1991 in which he held that since the gender of a transsexual person was to be determined according to biological criteria, sex reassignment surgery did not alter a person's gender. Thus, a marriage between an individual who had undergone a female-to-male sex change operation and a woman was void, being a marriage between two persons of the same gender. The decision prompted Parliament to amend the Women's Charter in 1996 to permit transsexual people to marry in the capacity of their new gender.

Rajah retired as a judge in 1995 and joined Harry Elias & Partners (now Harry Elias Partnership LLP) as a consultant. He also became the first President of the Tribunal for the Maintenance of Parents in 1996. The following year, he was appointed Senior Counsel in the first group of lawyers to be conferred this status. A member of the Singapore Mediation Centre and the Singapore International Arbitration Centre, he was active as a mediator and arbitrator. A frequent contributor to the Malayan Law Journal and the Singapore Law Gazette, particularly on criminal law and constitutional matters, a number of his legal articles provoked controversy.

Rajah was the Chairman of the Sri Aurobindo Society Singapore, the Secretary and later the President of the Hindu Centre, and the Vice-President of the Singapore Anti-Narcotics Association. He also served with the Hindu Endowments Board and the Society for the Physically Disabled. He was conferred the Pingat Bakti Masyarakat (Public Service Medal) at the National Day Awards in August 2002, and in October 2008 received the C.C. Tan Award, which recognizes lawyers who display the highest ideals of the profession, from the Law Society of Singapore.

Early years, education and career

The eldest of 13 children of a Sri Lankan couple, K. S. Rajah was born in Perai, Province Wellesley (now Seberang Perai), Penang, in what was then the Straits Settlements (now Malaysia) on 3 March 1930. His father was a clerk, and as the family was not well off he often could not afford books and had to borrow them and copy out texts by hand. He was a pupil of the Bukit Mertajam High School. Still a student during the Japanese Occupation, to contribute towards his family's finances he worked as a mess boy at a Japanese officers' mess and later as a translator for the Japanese authorities.

Rajah left school at the age of 16 years. His first job was as a wireless operator on shore for the Penang port authority, using Morse code to communicate with vessels at sea. Coming to Singapore in 1950, he started working as a teacher at Sembawang Primary School, and was sent for further training in the United Kingdom in 1953 on a scholarship from the Ministry of Education. On his return, he lectured at the Teachers' Training College. He became a Singapore citizen in 1958. In 1959 he joined the pioneer batch of law undergraduates at the University of Malaya in Singapore to study law part-time; in December the same year he married his wife Gnanambigai. The university became known as the University of Singapore in 1962, and Rajah graduated from it with a Bachelor of Laws with honours (LL.B. (Hons.)) the following year.

Legal career

Singapore Legal Service
Rajah joined the Singapore Legal Service in 1963, becoming a deputy public prosecutor and, later, senior state counsel with the Attorney-General's Chambers. He was admitted to the Bar on 18 May 1966. He handled a number of prominent criminal matters, including the Pulau Senang prison riot and Sunny Ang murder trials; and the Gold Bar murder case, in which a Hong Kong seaman was found to have tried to unlawfully import 165 gold bars and 134 gold coins worth S$86,076.70 without a permit. In September 1967 he led the prosecution of 262 members of the Barisan Sosialis political party (dissolved in 1988) for unlawful assembly and disturbing the peace, Singapore's largest criminal trial. He eventually led the Chambers' civil and criminal sections until 2 August 1972, when he was appointed to head the Official Assignee and Public Trustee's Office. He was also the longest-serving Director of the Singapore Legal Aid Bureau. In 1985, he retired from the Legal Service and went into private practice, establishing the firm of B. Rao & K. S. Rajah.

Judicial Commissioner

Between 15 May 1991 and 2 March 1995, Rajah served as a Judicial Commissioner of the Supreme Court of Singapore. During his time on the Bench, he decided a number of significant family law cases. In Lim Ying v. Hock Kian Ming Eric, he held that the gender of a transsexual person was to be determined according to biological criteria, which meant that sex reassignment surgery did not alter a person's gender. Thus, a marriage between an individual who had undergone female-to-male sex reassignment surgery and a woman was void, being a marriage between two persons of the same gender. The decision prompted Parliament to amend the Women's Charter to permit transsexual people to marry in the capacity of their new gender. In 1992, Rajah J.C. annulled the marriage of a 21-year-old woman whose family had forced her into an arranged marriage. This was believed to have been the first judicial decision of its kind in Singapore. Two years later, in another landmark case, he applied to a house-husband the principle that a divorced woman who has not contributed financially towards the acquisition of matrimonial assets is nonetheless entitled to a substantial share of them in view of her indirect contributions in the form of paying towards the household expenses or caring for the family.

Return to private practice
Following his retirement as a judge, Rajah joined the law firm Harry Elias & Partners (now known as Harry Elias Partnership LLP) as a consultant. He also became the first President of the Tribunal for the Maintenance of Parents, established in 1996 to entitle parents at least 60 years old and unable to maintain themselves adequately to apply for their children to be ordered to pay maintenance to them. In addition, he served as Chairman of the Law Society of Singapore's Committee on Guidance for the Legal Profession on Anti-Money Laundering. In 1997, Rajah was appointed Senior Counsel in the first group of lawyers to be conferred this status. He was subsequently appointed a member of the Singapore Mediation Centre in 1998, and of the Singapore International Arbitration Centre in 2003. He acted as sole arbitrator and as chairman of arbitral tribunals in domestic and international arbitrations, in particular arbitrations taking place in Bangladesh and India. He was also a referee of the Ministry of Manpower's Industrial Arbitration Court.

Rajah was an active contributor of legal articles to the Malayan Law Journal and the Singapore Law Gazette. An article in the August 2003 issue of the Law Gazette entitled "The Unconstitutional Punishment", which argued that the mandatory death penalty in Singapore was contrary to the Constitution of Singapore, was obliquely criticized by the Chief Justice Yong Pung How. Rajah, appearing before Yong C.J. in an appeal, submitted that a magistrate should have allowed his client to compound her offence of abusing her maid, arguing that "[t]he idea of composition is international". The Chief Justice said that Rajah, a person of "tremendous experience and wide learning", had stated in one of his "wonderful articles" that the death penalty was unconstitutional due to international law. However, he remarked: "I am not concerned with international law. I am a poor humble servant of the law in Singapore. Little island." On 22 March 2005, Rajah delivered a speech on the subject of his article at a LAWASIA conference in the Gold Coast, Queensland, Australia. Another Law Gazette article published in January 2006 which argued that the Court of Appeal's conviction of two men accused of murder who had been acquitted by the High Court violated the constitutional protection against double jeopardy was said by the Ministry of Law to be "legally flawed".

In his last case in 2008, he represented certain minority owners of flats in the Horizon Towers condominium before the High Court in their bid to block the collective sale of the housing development supported by a majority of flat owners. He argued, among other things, that the right to acquire, hold and dispose of property was enshrined in the Constitution, but failed to convince the judge. Although the minority owners were unsuccessful at trial, the judgment was later reversed by the Court of Appeal.

Active in volunteer work, Rajah was the Chairman of the Sri Aurobindo Society Singapore the Secretary and later the President of the Hindu Centre, and the Vice-President of the Singapore Anti-Narcotics Association. He also served with the Hindu Endowments Board, Kong Meng San Phor Kark See Temple, Mount Alvernia Hospital and the Society for the Physically Disabled.

Later years
Rajah died in hospital on 17 June 2010 at the age of 80 years, having suffered from angiosarcoma, a rare cancer of the lining of the blood vessels, of the scalp for a year. He was survived by his wife Gnanambigai Rajah; his sons Surenthiraraj (known as Suressh; as of June 2010 he was Head of Aviation and Shipping and a civil and commercial litigation partner at Harry Elias Partnership) and Yogenthiran, and daughters Jothie and Vaani; eight grandchildren; and 11 of his siblings.

Awards and honours
Rajah was conferred the Pingat Bakti Masyarakat (Public Service Medal) at the National Day Awards in August 2002. In October 2008 he received the C.C. Tan Award, which recognizes lawyers who display the highest ideals of the profession, from the Law Society for "his personal integrity, honesty and outstanding contributions to the legal profession".

Selected works

Articles and book chapters
. (See also .)
.
.
.
.
.
.
.
.
.
.
.
.
.
.
.
.
.
.
.
.
.
.
.
.
.
.

Books
.
.

Notes

References
.
.
.
.
.
.
.

Further reading
.

External links
Official website of the Singapore Legal Service
Official website of the Supreme Court of Singapore
Senior Counsel directory on the Singapore Academy of Law website

1930 births
2010 deaths
Deaths from cancer in Singapore
Deaths from angiosarcoma
Judicial Commissioners of Singapore
Malaysian emigrants to Singapore
People who lost Malaysian citizenship
Naturalised citizens of Singapore
Malaysian people of Indian descent
Recipients of the Pingat Bakti Masyarakat
Singaporean Hindus
Singaporean people of Sri Lankan Tamil descent
Singaporean Senior Counsel
University of Singapore alumni
Judges of the Supreme Court of Singapore